John Anthony Tyson (aka J. Anthony Tyson or Tony Tyson; born 5 April 1940, Pasadena) is an American physicist and astronomer.

Tyson received in 1962 his bachelor's degree from Stanford University and in 1967 his Ph. D. from the University of Wisconsin. He was a postdoc from 1967 to 1969 at the University of Chicago. He was then a member of the Technical Staff at AT&T Bell Laboratories from 1969 to 1985. In 1985 he became a Distinguished Member of the Technical Staff (a position for experienced scientists and engineers in major U. S. companies) at Bell Laboratories until 2004. Since 2004 he has been a professor at the University of California, Davis. 

In the late 1970s he applied CCDs to astronomy, discovering the faint blue galaxies.  Using these distant galaxies he made the first maps of dark matter using weak gravitational lensing. Tyson built the Big Throughput Camera, which was used to discover dark energy. In the 1990s he started a project to build a next generation sky survey, and directed the project for 15 years. He is now the Chief Scientist for the Large Synoptic Survey Telescope.

His research interests are cosmology, dark matter, dark energy, observational optical astronomy, experimental gravitational physics, and new instruments.

Honors and awards
 1984: Elected Fellow, American Physical Society
 1985: IR 100 Award, Industrial Research
 1996: Aaronson Memorial Prize
 1997: Elected Fellow, American Academy of Arts and Sciences
 1997: Elected a Member of the National Academy of Sciences
 1998: Scott Lecturer, Cavendish Laboratory, Cambridge University
 1998: Hon. D.Sc., University of Chicago
 1999: APS Centennial Speaker
 2000: Elected a Member of the American Philosophical Society
 2022: Asteroid 179223 Tonytyson, discovered by astronomers with the Sloan Digital Sky Survey in 2001, was named in his honor. The official  was published by IAU's WGSBN on 7 February 2022.

References

External links
 Tyson, Large Synoptic Survey Telescope
 Testimony of J. Anthony Tyson, Hearing on Near-Earth Objects: Status of the Survey Program and Review of NASA's 2007 Report to Congress

20th-century American physicists
21st-century American physicists
Fellows of the American Physical Society
Fellows of the American Academy of Arts and Sciences
Members of the United States National Academy of Sciences
Members of the American Philosophical Society
Stanford University alumni
University of Wisconsin–Madison alumni
University of California, Davis faculty
1940 births
Living people
University of Chicago people